New York's 80th State Assembly district is one of the 150 districts in the New York State Assembly. It has been represented by John Zaccaro Jr. since 2023, succeeding Nathalia Fernandez.

Geography
District 80 is in The Bronx. It contains the neighborhoods of Allerton, Pelham Gardens, Pelham Parkway and Morris Park.

Recent election results

2022

2020

2018

2018 special

2016

2014

2012

2010

References

80